The chestnut dunnart (Sminthopsis archeri) is a dunnart that was described by Van Dyck in 1986 and is named because of its chestnut colour in the upperparts of its body. The length from snout to tail is 167–210 mm, of which head to anus is 85–105 mm and tail is 82–105 mm long. The hind foot size is 17–20 mm, ear length is 17–21 mm and weight is 15–20 g.

Distribution and habitat
There are a handful of records known from southern Papua New Guinea and in Australia on the east and west coasts of Cape York Peninsula, with one record at Blackbraes National Park west of Townsville. Its habitats in Australia consist of tall stringybark woodlands and tall forests situated in red earth. In Papua New Guinea it is also found in savannah.

Social organisation and breeding
The species is little studied and not much information is known on the behaviour, but it does breed during July–October when it is the dry season.

Diet
It most likely feeds on insects and or small mammals, reptiles and amphibians.

References

Sources

External links
Australian Biological Resources Study
Sminthopsinae Taxonomy

Mammals of Queensland
Dasyuromorphs
Mammals of Papua New Guinea
Marsupials of Australia
Mammals described in 1986
Marsupials of New Guinea